Damocles is a 1982 role-playing game adventure published by Timeline for The Morrow Project.

Contents
Damocles is the second adventure scenario that was published for The Morrow Project, and is intended for experienced players.

Reception
William A. Barton reviewed Damocles in The Space Gamer No. 62. Barton commented that "Overall, Damocles is quite well done and should provide quite a bit of gaming enjoyment for TMP players, whether it is used as a one-shot scenario or as the first in what could be a lengthy campaign."

Chris Baylis reviewed Damocles for Imagine magazine, and stated that "The scenario is very well designed, but tends to get bogged down in the middle. An experienced PD will have the forethought to include minor (yet not fatal) diversions to keep the players' minds occupied during these passing phases."

Reviews
Different Worlds #46

References

Role-playing game supplements introduced in 1982
The Morrow Project adventures